Beck: Mongolian Chop Squad is an anime series adapted from the manga of the same title by Harold Sakuishi. The series consists of 26 episodes.

Beck was first aired on TV Tokyo in Japan on October 7, 2004 with the episode "The View at 14", and concluded with "America" on March 31, 2005. Beck first premiered in English on March 9, 2007 on Much Music in Canada. On September 1, 2008, Beck had premiered on the Funimation Channel in the United States. The first DVD was released in July 2007.

Though the titles are shown in Japanese in each episode's title cards, the English titles are also considered official along with the original ones (except for episode 7, originally called "Lucille" instead of "Prudence"). The opening theme for the series is "Hit in the USA" by Beat Crusaders, while two different songs were used for the ending: "My World Down", by Meister (which, in the show, is performed by the fictional band Dying Breed) from episodes 1 through 20, "Moon on the Water", also by Beat Crusaders (featuring Sowelu on vocals) from episode 21 to 25, and "Slip Out" by the eponymous band in the final episode.

Episode list
<onlyinclude>

References

Beck: Mongolian Chop Squad